Syrnolopsis gracilis is a species of medium-sized freshwater snails with an operculum, an aquatic gastropod mollusk in the family Paludomidae. This species is found in Lake Tanganyika which includes the countries of Burundi, the Democratic Republic of the Congo, Tanzania, and Zambia. The natural habitat of this species is freshwater lakes.

References

Paludomidae
Gastropods described in 1927
Taxa named by Joseph Charles Bequaert
Taxonomy articles created by Polbot